Arthur Papastamatis (born 12 February 1980) is an Australian professional football manager who serves as manager of Newcastle Jets.

Background & Education
Papas began learning his coaching skills at the age of 16 while a player and started learning full-time after retiring as a player due to six knee operations at the age of 25. Papas chose to focus his efforts on obtaining the necessary qualifications to become a professional football coach. In 2008 Papas furthered his coaching education at a KNVB-run coaching course in Canberra. At this course Papas was identified by the KNVB instructors as a potential professional coach and was recommended to receive the Australian Sports Commission Coaching Scholarship Award. Papas would subsequently accept this Award and moved to Canberra as part of the High Performance Coaching Program aimed at developing the skills and experience to coach athletes at elite level sport. Papas is a firm believer in further education in order to supplement experience. He holds the AFC Pro Coaching License, a master's degree in Sports Coaching, and a Bachelor of Applied Science - Exercise 
"I just felt that the coaching we received coming through the system wasn’t working in terms of knowledge",

Greek Heritage

Papas family bloodline originates in Greece and he maintains strong ties to his Greek heritage, he has frequently expressed his desire to coach in Greece at some point in his career. Papas coaching achievements and his subsequent Greek background has periodically attracted the interest of the Greek sporting media and he has often been interviewed about his affinity towards his ancestral background and his future ambitions to return to the birthplace of his family.

Career

Australian Institute of Sport

In 2009 Papas accepted the role of AIS Men's Football Scholarship Coach identified over time by Football Federation Australia Technical Directors Rob Baan and Han Berger as a potential elite level coach. This award had only held by a handful of Australians in the game's history and Papas relocated from Melbourne to Canberra to begin working at the Australian Institute of Sport under the mentorship of Dutch Coach Jan Versleijen. During this period Papas gained insights into world class high performance environments and sports and under the High Performance Program governed by the Australian Sports Commission and Football Federation Australia gained experiences working with the country's top potential talents as well as the Australian National Youth Teams both as a technical analyst and coach. Papas credits this part of his journey as a major point of difference in understanding the requirements to manage professionally.

Oakleigh Cannons
In late 2010, Papas, then 30 years of age, was appointed for the first time as Manager of Victorian Premier League side Oakleigh Cannons FC for the 2011 Victorian Premier League. He was the youngest ever coach in the Victorian Premier League. He guided his new club on 18 February 2011 against Northcote City SC ending the match victorious 3–2. Papas went on to lead the Cannons to equal first place at the culmination of the 2011 season qualifying the club for their first finals appearance in three seasons. Papas then led the team through the play-offs even defeating rival South Melbourne 1-0 along the way, qualifying the club for their first ever Grand Final appearance, they eventually lost in extra time of the penultimate game 3–2. Papas was subsequently voted 'Victorian Premier League - Coach of the Year', becoming the youngest recipient to receive the award in the history of the league.

Newcastle Jets

At the end of 2011, Papas was recruited by A-League side Newcastle Jets as First Team Assistant Coach and National Youth League Head Coach. At Newcastle Papas was reunited with Former Australian Institute of Sport Coach and Australian U17 Assistant Coach Gary Van Egmond. Papas inherited the Youth Team at mid-point of the season and guided them to finish with a 5-5-5-8 record whilst promoting numerous talents to the First Team. Papas assisted the Newcastle Jets First Team to a 7th-place finish in what was a rebuilding year under the new technical regime. Papas also guided the Jets Youth team to an unbeaten start as the first youth team in Australian to play in an open Men's First Division before resigning to take up the offer to become Head Coach of the India U23 Men's National Team.

Indian Under 23 National Team

Papas went to India upon the invitation of India FA Technical Director Rob Baan with a view to become the AIFF-FIFA Academy Head Coach based in Vashi, this would be the first of many Academies made under AIFF and FIFA for under-14 players in India. Papas stated that he came to India because "I received an invitation to join All India Football Federation from Technical Director Rob Baan who had implemented a philosophy in Australia which focused on the total restructure of the Youth Development System."and that "India is a country which is waiting to make its mark in World Football. Hence, the AIFF have joined forces with FIFA and PSV Eindhoven and have very big plans to shape the future by placing a major focus on the development of their Youth System. Personally he view it as a huge challenge – the challenge of developing a 'sleeping giant' into a powerful force."
However, prior to agreeing to stay in the anticipated role, Papas received another offer by the AIFF on 22 May 2012 after Raymond Libregts declined the offer to coach the India national under-23 football team and Pailan Arrows of the I-League, the team that grooms young players for professional careers. Therefore, Papas signed to coach the Indian under-23 Men's National Team and Pailan Arrows team for the 2012–13 I-League.
Papas took charge of the Indian U23 National team for their AFC Cup tournament in Oman guiding the team to their highest age group level results, upon conclusion stating "I will never be able to say I was completely satisfied because although we were the lowest ranked nation in the group by some way I came with the mindset that we could qualify. Like I have mentioned with 35 minutes to go in the final game this was still a possibility, in the future I would hope that the pressure of dealing with that last game will result in a further development of the playing group because they need more and more of these situations under pressure to further progress on an international level". 

Papas then took charge of Indian FA Development side Pailan Arrows for the 2012-13 I-League season, the Arrows was a club side purely made up of domestic based Under 23 players and playing in the highest domestic professional football league in India. They began their campaign against Delhi United during the 2012 Durand Cup on 25 August 2012 in which Pailan drew the match 2–2. However Pailan were officially knocked-out of the Durand Cup after drawing their second match against Air India on 28 August 2012. Under Papas the Arrows went on to significantly improve their results from the previous season and were lauded for their attacking style of play centred around ball possession and short passing combination play. Upon the completion of the 2012–13 season the Pailan Arrows project was disbanded due to a lack of funding

Dempo

On 28 May 2013, and on the back of a successful period with the Indian U23 National Team. Papas was appointed Head Coach of 3 time I-League Champions Dempo Sports Club, replacing Armando Colaco who served the Panjim-based club for 13 Years. Papas went on to guid the club to a higher position than the previous season finishing the I-League season in 4th and qualifying for the AFC Cup. Additionally the club would win the GFA Cup and place as finalist in the Federation Cup. As part of a tie up between Dempo SC owner Srinivas Dempo and the newly formed Indian Super League competition, Papas spent time as Assistant Coach to Zico for Indian Super League franchise FC Goa in the league's inaugural season.

Return to Oakleigh Cannons

After returning to Australia from India at the beginning of 2015, Papas would answer an SOS call and return to his first senior head coaching role club Oakleigh Cannons following the resignation of Miron Bleiberg due to a poor start in the 2015 National Premier Leagues Victoria. Papas inherited the team from Bleiberg whilst they were languishing in second last position with 4pts from 9 games. Papas was able to revive the club's fortunes leading the Cannons to safety in the league and consolidating their position in the top tier of football in Victoria for the following season. Outside of ensuring the club's league status, Papas led the club to their first ever Dockerty Cup Final, as well as guiding the Cannons through the qualifying rounds of the 2015 FFA Cup where they would defeat South Australian and Queensland opponents before being knocked out of the FFA Cup by Hume City in the quarter final. This feat still remains the Cannons highest ever position on the national stage.

Green Gully SC
Green Gully SC announced that they had appointed Papas as the manager for the 2016 NPL Victoria season. Under Papas, Gully managed one of the biggest upsets in Australian football history defeating A-League side Central Coast Mariners in the Round of 32 of the 2016 FFA Cup, when Liam Boland scored a long-range 92nd-minute winner at Green Gully Reserve. Green Gully made it to the quarter finals of the FFA Cup, before being knocked out by Canberra Olympic FC in the last minute of extra time. It currently stands as the highest ever position Gully has finished on the national stage. Under Papas, Green Gully returned to finals football in 2016 after a three-season absence as well making the Dockerty Cup Final. In 2017, Gully again reached the finals for the second consecutive season. Papas moved on from Green Gully after accepting an offer to coach again in Asia.

Ettifaq FC

Papas joined Saudi Professional League club Ettifaq FC working alongside former VV Venlo coach Eelco Schattorie for the latter part of the Saudi Professional League season. They joined Ettifaq FC whilst the club was in the middle of a relegation battle after not having won in a league match for three months. Together they managed to save the Pro League club from relegation with two games to spare."Our predicament was not the easiest situation to inherit as the team hadn’t won a league match since 24 November, and in a situation like this there are numerous factors surrounding the dynamics of the team which clearly are not functioning at an optimum level. So to improve the results, whilst finding a playing style that was suited the characteristics of the playing group, was a fine balancing act but one we managed to navigate successfully.I was privileged to work in the Saudi Pro League and with their players and therefore understand deeply the affiliation they have for their country and what it means to them all as football really is the only sport that matters there.”

Double Pass
In 2018, Papas was appointed Project Manager and Football Consultant for Belgian-based Talent Development Company, Double Pass. Papas led an experienced group of European coaches in consulting to Japanese & US professional football clubs on how to optimise their talent development structures.

Northeast United FC

In 2018 Papas returned to India and teamed up again with Dutch Coach Eelco Schattorie to take over Indian Super League side Northeast United FC. "It’s a very difficult job here in the north east of India. They are the only club never to qualify for ISL playoffs. But it's gone well so far, we amassed the same points after five games than we did in 18 last season". Northeast United FC eventually qualified for their maiden ISL finals appearance and this still remains their only finals appearance in the ISL since the league's inception. "This ISL has improved a lot from when I was first here. The foreign players are a lot better now. It’s not just about marquees anymore. It’s a longer league too, going now for eight months". Papas left NorthEast United FC prior to the finals series to link up with J.League team Yokohama F. Marinos for the 2019 season.

Yokohama F. Marinos

In January 2019, Papas was appointed Assistant Coach of J-league side Yokohama F. Marinos joining Ange Postecoglou and Peter Cklamovski as part of the Australian contingent at the club. They went on to create history and become J.League champions winning the club's first championship in 15 years, the first Australians to win a league title in Japan. Papas was then elevated to Head Coach under Postecoglou in 2020 explaining "I think I'm in a really good period in my career, working for someone I really respect and can learn so much from and challenge myself. For me it's an outstanding learning period that will hold me in really good stead, wherever I want to go down the track. I'm working for one of the most successful coaches in world football. It's measurable at the top level in the world, let alone the country.”

Kagoshima United
In December 2020, Papas was appointed Coach of J3 League side Kagoshima United. Papas departed partway through the season due to family reasons.

Return to Newcastle Jets
On 28 June 2021, Papas was appointed as manager of A-League team Newcastle Jets.

Managerial statistics

References

I-League managers
Pailan Arrows managers
Dempo SC managers
Australian people of Greek descent
Greek football managers
Greek expatriate football managers
Australian soccer coaches
Australian expatriate soccer coaches
J3 League managers
Kagoshima United FC managers
Newcastle Jets FC managers
1980 births
Living people
Indian Arrows FC managers